A lossy data conversion method is one where converting data between one storage format and another displays data in a form that is "close enough" to be useful, but may differ in some ways from the original.  This type of conversion is used frequently between software packages that rely on different storage techniques.  In many cases, a software package such as Microsoft Word will enable a document stored in one format to be saved as another, in particular HTML.  The document saved in the lossy format may look identical, but the conversion can also cause some loss of fidelity or functionality.

Types of lossy conversion
There are three basic types of lossy data conversion:

 With in-place lossy data conversion, software packages such as IBM's Lotus Domino transform a proprietary rich text format into a web standard HTML as the page is requested.  Because the page is served up just in time, it can rely on the existence of the software package to handle specialized data features that may not be available in the new format natively.  On the other hand, the converted data may not be usable outside of the in-place context.
 With file export lossy data conversion, software packages allow either a File Export to the new data storage format, or a File Save to the new data storage format.  The former leaves the original content in its original format and creates a new lossy version in the named file.  The latter changes the format of the existing file.
 With extraction lossy data conversion, software packages take content stored by a different software package and extract out the content to the desired format.  This may allow data to be extracted in a format not recognized by the original software package.

Other types of data
Graphic data (images) is often converted from one data storage format to another.  Such conversions are usually described separately as either lossy data compression or lossless data compression.

See also
 Round-trip format conversion
 Transcoding

Computer file formats
Data compression